The Future Of Jobs Fund was a UK government initiative introduced in 2009 which aimed to help long term unemployed people back into employment. It was cut by the Coalition government, Prime Minister David Cameron claiming the scheme was "expensive, badly targeted and did not work". However, a 2012 report by the Department for Work and Pensions (DWP) found that the scheme produced a net benefit though tax receipts and a reduced benefits bill. It estimated that the FJF programme resulted in:
 a net benefit to participants of approximately £4,000 per participant
 a net benefit to employers of approximately £6,850 per participant
 a net cost to the Exchequer of approximately £3,100 per participant
 a net benefit to society of approximately £7,750 per participant

Under the baseline assumptions, the total net cost of the programme to the Exchequer was estimated to be approximately £330m. The gross cost to the
Exchequer was approximately £720m but it is estimated to have recouped roughly 50 pence for each pound that was spent on the programme.

See also
 New Deal of the Mind

References

Unemployment in the United Kingdom